Allanblackia stuhlmannii is a species of flowering plant in the family Clusiaceae. It is found only in Tanzania.

Commercial use 

An infrastructure is being developed for international scale commercial use . It is hoped that by commercializing non-timber forest products and increasing the value of forests for local people this will result in their help in conserving this natural resource .

References

stuhlmannii
Endemic flora of Tanzania
Vulnerable plants
Taxonomy articles created by Polbot
Oil seeds